Polycera hedgpethi, common name Hedgpeth's dorid, is a species of nudibranch, a shell-less marine gastropod mollusk in the family Polyceratidae.

Distribution
This species was described from California, USA. It is believed to be invasive and has been reported from Western Australia, New South Wales and Victoria, Australia ; South Africa and New Zealand. It has also been reported from the Mediterranean Sea.

References

Polyceridae
Gastropods described in 1964